Martin Jenkin (born 1 March 1975) was an English cricketer who was born in Redruth, and was a left-handed batsman who played for Cornwall.

Playing career
Jenkin made a single List A appearance for the side during the C&G Trophy in August 2002, against Somerset Cricket Board. From the lower-middle order, he scored 6 runs with the bat. He took figures of 2-44 from seven overs with the ball.

Jenkin played for Hayle in the Cornwall Cricket League in 2007.

External links

Martin Jenkin at CricketArchive 

1975 births
Living people
English cricketers
Cornwall cricketers
People from Redruth